Tweetsie Railroad is a family-oriented heritage railroad and Wild West amusement park located between Boone and Blowing Rock, North Carolina, United States.  The centerpiece of the park is a  ride on a train pulled by one of Tweetsie Railroad's two historic narrow-gauge steam locomotives. 

The park also features a variety of amusement rides, live shows, a zoo and other attractions geared towards families with children. The park also hosts a variety of special events throughout the year including their Halloween and Christmas-themed events.

Park history

Opened on July 4, 1957, Tweetsie Railroad began as an excursion train ride pulled by coal-fired steam locomotive #12, the only surviving narrow-gauge engine of the East Tennessee and Western North Carolina Railroad (ET&WNC).  Built in 1917 by the Baldwin Locomotive Works, #12 is a  narrow gauge  coal-fired locomotive that ran from 1918 to 1940 carrying passengers and freight over the ET&WNC's  line through the Appalachian Mountains from Johnson City, Tennessee to Boone, North Carolina. 

The name "Tweetsie" was given to the original ET&WNC by area residents as a verbal acronym of its initials, but also referring to the shrill "tweet, tweet" of the locomotive whistles that echoed through the mountains.  The nickname stuck with the railroad and its trains and became more identifiable than the railroad's official name.  On February 9, 2017, Locomotive #12 celebrated its 100th Birthday. An official ceremony was held for the locomotive during Tweetsie Railroad's Heritage Weekend on August 26, 2017.

Two years after the  narrow-gauge portion of the ET&WNC ceased operations in 1950, the locomotive was purchased by a group of railroad enthusiasts and taken to Penn Laird, Virginia to operate as the Shenandoah Central Railroad, which opened in May 1953. Rains from Hurricane Hazel washed out the Shenandoah Central in October, 1954, and Locomotive #12 was once again put up for sale. Cowboy actor and singer Gene Autry optioned the locomotive with the intent to move it to California for use in motion pictures. However, Autry ultimately determined that the transportation and restoration costs made his plan impractical.

Grover Robbins, an entrepreneur from Blowing Rock, North Carolina, purchased Autry's option and bought the locomotive in August, 1955. Robbins moved the #12 locomotive back to its native Blue Ridge Mountains as the centerpiece of a new "Tweetsie Railroad" tourist attraction. One mile of track was constructed near Blowing Rock, North Carolina, and on July 4, 1957, the locomotive made its first public trip over the line. In 1958, the track was extended to a 3-mile loop around the mountain, and the trains at Tweetsie Railroad have traveled that circuit ever since. Grover Robbins' brothers, Harry and Spencer, were also involved with the operation of Tweetsie Railroad, and the park is still controlled and operated by the Robbins family.

In 1960, Tweetsie acquired another coal-fired steam locomotive, USATC S118 Class  #190, the "Yukon Queen" from Alaska's White Pass and Yukon Route. Also built by Baldwin Locomotive Works in 1943 for the US Army, the engine was part of an 11-locomotive fleet of "MacArthur" 2-8-2s originally purchased for use overseas.  During World War II, the locomotives were sent to Alaska for use on the White Pass and Yukon. Locomotive #190 celebrated its 75th birthday in 2018.

Tourist attraction
Tweetsie Railroad became a popular tourist attraction, and quickly evolved into the first theme park in North Carolina—and one of the first in the nation. A western town and saloon were built around the original depot area.  A train robbery and cowboy-and-Indian show were added to the train ride, playing off the Wild West theme that was very popular at the time on television and in movies. The theme was enhanced by regular visits from Charlotte's WBTV television personality/singing cowboy Fred Kirby, who hosted a popular children's show.  In 1961, a chairlift and amusement ride area was constructed on the central mountain inside the rail loop, and over the decades the park has been expanded with additional rides, attractions, shops, zoo and restaurants.

In 2017, Tweetsie Railroad's 60th anniversary season, the park introduced the "Tweetsie Christmas" holiday-themed event.

Dollywood
In 1961, Grover and Harry Robbins built another train ride and tourist attraction called "Rebel Railroad" in the Smoky Mountains near Pigeon Forge, Tennessee. Originally featuring a Civil War theme, the park was renamed "Goldrush Junction" in 1966 and re-themed to a Wild West concept very similar to Tweetsie Railroad. The Robbins brothers sold Goldrush Junction in the late 1960s, and it subsequently went through various owners. In 1976, Jack and Pete Herschend of Branson, Missouri bought the Pigeon Forge facility and redeveloped it as "Silver Dollar City". In 1986, country music star Dolly Parton became a part-owner with the Herschends and the theme park became today's Dollywood. The railroad continues to run as the Dollywood Express.

General information
Tweetsie Railroad is located on US 321 between Boone and Blowing Rock, North Carolina.

Tweetsie Railroad's Wild West-themed operating season is from April to October, The park is open weekends in the spring and autumn, as well as daily from Memorial Day weekend until mid-August. In addition, the park is open on Friday and Saturday nights from late September through the month of October for the very-popular "Ghost Train" Halloween event. The park then closes for daytime operations; then re-opens on select evenings starting in around Thanksgiving for "Tweetsie Christmas", which runs through the month of December. Other special events are held throughout the season, including a large fireworks display on the Independence Day Fourth of July, and Railroad Heritage Weekend in August, which focuses on the history of Tweetsie Railroad's narrow-gauge locomotives.

Tweetsie Railroad is open from early April through October, and on select nights in late November through December for the Tweetsie Christmas event. In addition to the Wild West train adventure and the amusement rides, Tweetsie Railroad has a variety of live entertainment shows featuring talented performers selected from the immediate area and from the Southeast. The park hosts numerous special events each season, including Letterland-themed days in May for school groups, visits by Thomas the Tank Engine and a very popular nighttime "Ghost Train" Halloween event in October.

Locomotive workshop
Tweetsie Railroad also has its own locomotive workshop to maintain its two locomotives as well as overhauling other steam locomotives from several different theme parks such as Walt Disney World, Busch Gardens, Six Flags and Dollywood Express.

Rides and attractions
Rides at Tweetsie Railroad include:

"Free Fall" Drop Tower ride
Round Up
"Tornado" spinning ride
Carousel
Tilt-a-whirl
Ferris wheel
"Tweetsie Twister" scrambler ride
Chairlift
"Turnpike Cruiser" ride
Himalaya
Little Drummer Boy, a classic teacups ride (Tweetsie Christmas only)
Mouse Mine Train ( narrow gauge child-oriented train ride loop through a tunnel that houses an animatronic show)
Several small children's rides:
F-80 Jet Planes
Kiddie Boats
Red Baron planes and helicopters
Bikes & Buggies

Other attractions at Tweetsie Railroad include the Tweetsie Palace Saloon and Diamond Lil's Can-Can Revue, other live shows, gold panning and gem mining, Deer Park zoo, a variety of specialty shops and food service locations, and a game arcade.

Model railways
ET&WNC #12 is notable in the modeling world as being the prototype for the famous Bachmann "Big Hauler" G scale 4-6-0, which has been in production (with many revisions) since the 1980s and has long been one of the most popular models in the garden railroad hobby. Bachmann also produces an On30 scale version of the model.

Locomotives

See also

Land of Oz (theme park): another park developed by Grover Robbins
Dollywood: amusement park in Pigeon Forge, Tennessee
Silver Dollar City: amusement park in Branson, Missouri

References

External links
 
 "Tweetsie Comes Home" article in the October, 1957 issue of Ties, the Southern Railway System magazine.

3 ft gauge railways in the United States
1957 establishments in North Carolina
Amusement parks in North Carolina
Amusement parks opened in 1957
Appalachian culture in North Carolina
Buildings and structures in Watauga County, North Carolina
Heritage railroads in North Carolina
Landmarks in North Carolina
Narrow gauge railroads in North Carolina
National Register of Historic Places in Watauga County, North Carolina
Railroads of amusement parks in the United States
Tourist attractions in Watauga County, North Carolina
Railway vehicles on the National Register of Historic Places
Rail transportation on the National Register of Historic Places in North Carolina
Western (genre) theme parks